Miles Edward O'Brien is a character in the Star Trek franchise, portrayed by actor Colm Meaney. O'Brien appears occasionally in all seven seasons of Star Trek: The Next Generation and is a main cast member of Star Trek: Deep Space Nine. O'Brien was originally the transporter chief of the USS Enterprise-D. He was later promoted to chief of operations of Deep Space Nine. Being portrayed in 225 episodes overall, O'Brien is the Star Trek character with the second most appearances in the Star Trek franchise, second only to Worf (Michael Dorn).

O'Brien is the only major Star Trek character described as both ethnically Irish and born in Ireland; Colm Meaney, the actor who portrays him, is also Irish.

Early Appearances
According to Colm Meaney, at first O'Brien "was just there, not really established as a character, and that went on for a bit." He has a few lines in the pilot TNG episode, "Encounter at Farpoint". Appearing on and off in subsequent episodes, mainly operating the ship's transporters, it wasn't until the second-season episode "Unnatural Selection" that Meaney's character was named, and the second episode of season 4, "Family," before the character was given a first name, and his personal life began to be developed. However, Meaney came to like the arrangement of being hired on an episode-by-episode basis, and was hesitant to sign on as a regular on DS9. Along with Worf, Miles O'Brien is one of the two characters that moved from TNG to be a main character on DS9. Rick Berman said the character was named Miles after his nephew.

Character postings
 USS Rutledge
 Junior tactical Officer
 Setlik III - Skirmish with Cardassian forces during the Cardassian/Federation war
 USS Enterprise-D
 Conn officer
 Transporter chief
 Operations and engineering
 Acting tactical Officer
 Deep Space Nine (Federation administered Bajoran station)
 Chief of Operations
 Chief Engineer USS Defiant (Support starship assigned to Deep Space Nine)
 Starfleet Academy - San Francisco, California, Earth
 Professor of Engineering

Character story

Backstory
The backstory of the character states that Miles O'Brien was born in Killarney, a town in County Kerry in Ireland, Earth, in September 2328. He claims descent from Brian Boru, the famous Ard Rí, or High King of Ireland (and founder of the O'Brien Clan). His father, Michael O'Brien, wanted him to play the cello, so he pursued this and was eventually accepted into the Aldebaran Music Academy (revealed in DS9 episode "Shadowplay"). However, a few days before he was scheduled to start classes there, he enlisted in Starfleet. O'Brien can also be seen playing the cello as part of Data's string quartet early in the TNG episode "The Ensigns of Command". In the DS9 episode "Invasive Procedures", it is revealed he has two brothers.

The TNG episode "The Wounded" establishes that O'Brien served as tactical officer aboard the USS Rutledge during the Cardassian War and that he was emotionally scarred by the Cardassians' massacre of hundreds of civilians on Setlik III. O'Brien does not remember how many Cardassians he killed, because he killed so many (Star Trek DS9: "The Inquisition"). In that episode, it is clear that the classic Irish tune "The Minstrel Boy" plays a major part of his journey as a character: an innocent man thrown into the destructive nature of war. He sings the song in this episode, and much later, in the final episode of DS9 "What You Leave Behind". "The Minstrel Boy" is the first musical theme to be heard in the flashback sequence.

In the DS9 episode "Bar Association", O'Brien jokingly claims to be a direct descendant of real-life Irish High King Brian Boru (according to Irish tradition, all people with the surname "O'Brien" are Boru's descendants). Later, he speaks more seriously of fictional ancestor Sean Aloysius O'Brien, a major player in one of the first United States workers' unions, who participated in the Coal Strike of 1902 in Pennsylvania and was shot, then dumped into the Allegheny River. In the episode "Rules of Engagement", it is revealed that during O'Brien's 22 years in Starfleet, he had fought in 235 separate battles and had been decorated by Starfleet on 15 occasions, and was considered to be an expert in starship combat.

Depiction in Star Trek: The Next Generation
O'Brien's first appearance in Star Trek: The Next Generation as the battle bridge flight controller in The Next Generation premiere episode "Encounter at Farpoint", with his only other appearance in the first season being as a security guard in the episode "Lonely Among Us". Starting with the second-season premiere, "The Child", O'Brien began his regular role as the ship's transporter operator, a position which had usually been filled by the since-departed Tasha Yar in the first season. In the following episode, "Where Silence Has Lease", when Riker and Worf prepare to beam to the USS Yamato, Riker refers to him as a lieutenant and the character is wearing lieutenant collar pips. He still wears lieutenant pips in "Sarek", but in later episodes, the collar symbol has changed and O'Brien is referred to simply as Chief. (See "Rank" below).

In 2367, he confronted Capt. Benjamin Maxwell, his former commanding officer on the USS Rutledge, when Maxwell attacked Cardassian ships and outposts without authorisation and threatened the peace between the Federation and the Cardassian Union (TNG: "The Wounded").

During the Klingon Civil War, O'Brien is assigned to the bridge as tactical officer due to Worf's resignation from Starfleet and the temporary reassignment of officers to other ships in a fleet led by Capt. Picard (TNG: "Redemption Part II").

O'Brien marries Keiko Ishikawa aboard the USS Enterprise-D in the TNG episode "Data's Day". They have a daughter, Molly, who is delivered by Worf in "Disaster".

O'Brien appears in over 50 episodes of Star Trek: The Next Generation:

 "Encounter at Farpoint" 
 "Lonely Among Us" 
 "The Child" 
 "Where Silence Has Lease" 
 "Loud As A Whisper" 
 "Unnatural Selection" 
 "A Matter Of Honor" 
 "The Measure Of A Man" 
 "The Dauphin" 
 "Contagion" 
 "The Royale" 
 "Time Squared" 
 "The Icarus Factor" 
 "Pen Pals" 
 "Q Who" 
 "Up The Long Ladder" 
 "Manhunt" 
 "The Emissary" 
 "Shades of Gray" 
 "The Ensigns of Command" 
 "The Bonding" 
 "Booby Trap" 
 "The Enemy" 
 "The Hunted" 
 "A Matter of Perspective" 
 "Tin Man" 
 "Hollow Pursuits" 
 "The Most Toys" 
 "Sarek" 
 "Transfigurations" 
 "The Best of Both Worlds" (Part I and Part II)
 "Family" 
 "Brothers" 
 "Remember Me" 
 "Legacy" 
 "Data's Day" 
 "The Wounded" 
 "Clues" 
 "Night Terrors" 
 "Half a Life" 
 "The Mind's Eye" 
 "In Theory" 
 "Redemption II" 
 "Darmok" 
 "Disaster" 
 "The Game" 
 "Power Play" 
 "Realm of Fear" 
 "Rascals" 
 "All Good Things..."

Depiction in Star Trek: Deep Space Nine

The character of Miles O'Brien was transplanted from TNG to DS9 at the beginning of the latter show. In the story, Miles O'Brien transfers from the Enterprise-D to Deep Space Nine in the DS9 premiere episode "Emissary", to serve as the station's chief of operations.  He would later assume an additional role as chief engineer of the USS Defiant, which is assigned to Deep Space Nine in the episode "The Search".

O'Brien's character is unusual among Star Trek main characters. As well as being a non-commissioned officer, he is also a family man with a wife and children. He is often portrayed as being less patrician, and more pragmatic and down-to-earth than his colleagues. The producers would routinely put O'Brien under intense psychological pressure in episodes jokingly dubbed "O'Brien must suffer". O'Brien was regularly chosen for such storylines because it was felt people could empathise with him. For example, in one episode ("Hard Time") he is falsely convicted of espionage and given the simulated memory of a 20-year prison sentence; in another ("Visionary"), he repeatedly time-travels into the future, witnessing his own death and the destruction of Deep Space Nine. 

While at DS9, he meets Dr. Julian Bashir, who initially irritates O'Brien (Episode: "The Storyteller"), but the two characters eventually become best friends. In particular, they frequently play darts and fight historical battles in the holosuites.

In 2373, he has a son, Kirayoshi, delivered by surrogate Kira Nerys in the episode "The Begotten".

At the end of Deep Space Nine, O'Brien and his family depart the station to move back to Earth, where Miles is to serve as an engineering professor at Starfleet Academy. The soundtrack accompanying these moments on screen is to the tune of "The Minstrel Boy".

O'Brien is briefly mentioned in Star Trek: Lower Decks as the "most important person in Starfleet history" during a brief cutaway to the far future.

Mirror Universe
Miles O'Brien of the Mirror Universe was a Terran slave who worked for the Klingon-Cardassian Alliance aboard station Terok Nor. In 2370, O'Brien was working in the station's ore processing center. O'Brien was also occasionally recruited to repair Benjamin Sisko's raider when it was docked at the station. Sisko claimed he hated the name Miles, and instead nicknamed O'Brien "Smiley". Miles was known on the station for being an excellent "tinkerer and putterer".

When Smiley met a Julian Bashir from another universe in the ore processing center, he initially thought that Bashir's "wild" tales of his counterpart being Chief of Operations was simply a ruse to get him to help Bashir. However, Bashir was able to persuade him to help after he realised that anything had to be better than being a slave. Smiley agreed to help Bashir try to escape from the station only if he could go back with him to the other universe. When Captain Sisko defied Intendant Kira Nerys who commanded the station, Smiley changed his mind and decided to join Sisko's crew, deciding that there was something worth staying for after all (Episode: "Crossover").

When Mirror Sisko was killed by the Alliance in early 2371, Smiley took charge of the Terran Rebellion. To complete Sisko's last mission, he recruited Benjamin Sisko to take the place of his deceased counterpart long enough to convince Jennifer Sisko to leave the Alliance and start working for the Rebellion (Episode: "Through the Looking Glass").

While he was aboard Deep Space 9, Smiley took the opportunity to download a large portion of the station's database, including the schematics for the USS Defiant. Smiley used the stolen specifications to build a warship, which they named Defiant. After the rebels managed to capture Terok Nor from the Alliance, the Alliance prepared to recapture the station. Smiley once again recruited Sisko to help them finish construction of the Defiant in time. After successfully defending the station, Smiley sent Sisko back home (Episode: "Shattered Mirror").

In 2375, Smiley was in command of the Defiant when it pursued Brunt's ship as it stole a cloaking device from the station, and later negotiated Regent Worf's surrender and capture (Episode: "The Emperor's New Cloak").

Rank
During the story progression of TNG and DS9, O'Brien's rank and insignia were inconsistent until it was firmly established for DS9: one silver-rimmed black insignia (TNG: "Encounter at Farpoint"), lieutenant insignia ("Redemption, Part II", "Data's Day", etc.), and then one gold-rimmed black insignia (DS9: "Emissary"). Sergey Rozhenko calls him a Chief Petty Officer in "Family" (TNG) but he had been referred to in previous episodes as Lieutenant. Eventually, O'Brien receives a distinct senior chief petty officer's insignia and his rank is emphatically identified in "Hippocratic Oath" (DS9).

Actor commentary 
In interviews, Colm Meaney has praised the writing of the character, and noted "there was a terrific kind of humanity in O'Brien".

Reception
In 2009, IGN rated O'Brien the 17th best character of all  Star Trek up to that time.

In 2012, TrekMovie.com recommended the episode "The Wounded" for Saint Patrick's Day, praising O'Brien's rendition of the Irish ballad "Minstrel Boy".

In 2016, O'Brien was ranked as the 17th most important character of Starfleet within the Star Trek science fiction universe by Wired magazine. In 2018, CBR ranked O'Brien the 15th best Starfleet character of Star Trek. (Starfleet is a fictional organization within the Star Trek science fiction universe.)

In 2016, Screen Rant rated O'Brien as the 20th best character in Star Trek overall as presented in television and film up to that time, highlighting the character's role in episodes such as  "Hard Time", "Tribunal", "The Wounded", and "Time’s Orphan".

In 2017, IndieWire ranked O'Brien as the 13th best character on Star Trek: The Next Generation.

In 2020, Screen Rant ranked O'Brien one of the top 5 most likeable characters on the Star Trek: Deep Space Nine. In addition, they ranked him and Keiko as the 5th best romantic couple of all Star Trek.

In March 2020, O'Brien was praised as a positive depiction of Irish culture in media by Irish media company Entertainment.ie. In particular they noted he had a Dublin accent and praised Meaney's overall presentation of Irishness.

References

External links

 Miles O'Brien at StarTrek.com

Fictional attempted suicides
Television characters introduced in 1987
Fictional chief petty officers
Fictional Irish people
Fictional people from the 24th-century
Fictional professors
Star Trek: Deep Space Nine characters
Star Trek: The Next Generation characters
Starfleet engineers

de:Figuren im Star-Trek-Universum#Senior Chief Petty Officer (SCPO) Miles Edward O’Brien